Ampulloclitocybe is a genus of three species of fungi with a widespread distribution.

See also
List of Agaricales genera

References

Agaricales genera
Hygrophoraceae